Cors y Llyn National Nature Reserve can be found about 2.5 kilometres south of Newbridge on Wye, off the A470 road in mid-Wales.

The bogs and open water at the centre of the reserve are enclosed by a band of trees, which are surrounded by an area of pasture. The meadow at the site's entrance is one of the richest in wild flowers in Mid Wales.

References

National nature reserves in Wales